Cabagan, officially the Municipality of Cabagan, is a 1st class municipality in the province of Isabela, Philippines. According to the 2020 census, it has a population of 53,897 people.

Cabagan had been the business center of three nearby towns (Santa Maria, San Pablo and Santo Tomas) before they had their own market. It is locally known for its pancit Cabagan. Its people are called Ybanags. Nowadays, Ybanags are well educated and the source of the province's top politicians, professionals and a world class athlete.

During Christmas, the Cabagan Square Park can be seen flashing brightly with many Christmas lights and lanterns. Malasi Lake is a sanctuary for migratory birds located in barangay San Antonio. The biggest gymnasium in Isabela and in the whole Region 2 is located in this town, as well as a century-old well that was built by the Spaniards, located at St. Ferdinand College, Cabagan Campus.

Etymology
Etymologically, the name Cabagan may have originated from the native word bag or bajaque, not because "G-strings" were used here or made in Cabagan, but most probably because there were stores in the village. Cabagan could have also been derived from the word cabbagang, meaning "pilgrim" or "stranger". Based on the fact that Cabagan at the time was in constant contact with members of the "pagan tribes" from Diffun, namely southern Isabela as well as with the "Kalingas", of the neighboring Cordillera mountains.

History

Various Cabagan
The Cabagan of old, that existed from 1646 to 1877 was simply called, "Cabagan".
In 1877, the Spaniards decided to transfer present-day Cabagan to a new site, abandoning the old Cabagan.
In 1888, the Spaniards resurrected the abandoned Cabagan, into a new town.  With this development, there were now two Cabagans.
The Spaniards rectified the predicament by naming the first Cabagan as Cabagan Viejo, and the second Cabagan as Cabagan Nuevo or the new Cabagan.

Apparently, the name was not to the liking of the new rulers, the Americans.  When the Americans came to rule the Philippines after the Spaniards, they renamed Cabagan Nuevo as simply "Cabagan", and the old namesake, as the town of San Pablo.

Foundation
The old Cabagan, Cabagan Viejo which is now called "San Pablo", was the key town in the colonization of the Irrayas and to some extent Diffun, i.e., southern Isabela. The Irraya rebelled and the only ones that the Spaniards could claim, were some three hundred families who agreed to establish the village of Maquilla, near Tuguegarao City. Cabagan became a charter town on November 30, 1646, and ecclesiastically on May 15, 1647, with Saint Paul the Apostle as the patron saint.

New Cabagan (Cabagan Nuevo)
The new Cabagan came to exist, because the Spanish government decreed that on January 25, 1877, the old Cabagan or San Pablo of today, be transferred from its old site, to the one that is now occupying.  The brainchild of the transfer of Cabagan, was parish priest Pedro Ricart, who then made representations with the Spanish government, for the transfer.  Father Jose Burgues History of Cagayan Valley gave the unhealthiness of the old site, the reason for the transfer.  Others had stated though, that Cabagan was transferred because progress appeared to be bypassing the old Cabagan, in favor of the villages to the south, near Cabagan's present site. The new site was the area between the villages of Ugad and Luquilu, villages that exists up to this day.  The site is not far from the old, with the church of the new Cabagan just some three kilometers or so, south from that of the old.

The transfer was not without friction though.  A number of Cabagan's inhabitants opposed the transfer.  But the missionary's will had prevailed.  In contempt, as it were of the natives' opposition, the missionary uprooted the Church of the old Cabagan and brought the images and other vestments, to the new Cabagan.

When the Spaniards established a new town, they also endeavored to build a massive church and convent made of stone, brick and mortar.  From 1877, when the new Cabagan was established, and culminating with the Philippine Revolution that deposed the ruling Spaniards 19 years later (1896), the then governing Spaniards were still not able to complete all constructions needed, for the new Cabagan.
Cabagan is a known meeting place among revolutionaries during the Spanish occupation.

Geography
Cabagan is a land-locked municipality in the Cagayan River valley in the north of Luzon Island. The town center is located on the eastern banks of the Cagayan River.

Barangays
Cabagan is politically subdivided into 26 barangays. These barangays are headed by elected officials: Barangay Captain, Barangay Council, whose members are called Barangay Councilors. All are elected every three years.

There are three barangays that are considered urban (highlighted in bold).

Climate

Demographics

Language

Cabagan was part of the Irraya region and its language was Irraya. The Spaniards however, made the Ibanag language "The official language of the Valley", and had exerted all efforts to make everyone speak the dialect. Since then, the Irraya tongue gradually disappeared from the Cabagan psyche. When people uttered Irraya before, they were discouraged or forbidden to speak, because that was the language of the "pagans" at the time, the Kalingas.  Whenever the townsfolk enter the poblacion, none would speak of Irraya, for they would be considered despicably as, a "Kalinga" or as "ignorant persons", living in the mountains.

Today, no one speaks Irraya. There are however, a few barrios in Cabagan today, like San Bernardo and Tallag, wherein the Ibanag dialect gets interspersed with Irraya.  However, some older generation townsfolk, could also remember sentences in Irraya. Ilocano is also spoken in parts of Cabagan because of migration of poor Ilocanos from other parts of Luzon to seek opportunities. English, being one of the official languages is used primarily in communication for government publications, local newsprints, road signs, commercial signs and in doing official business transactions. Tagalog, another official language and is also considered the national language is used as verbal communication channel between residents.

Economy

Pancit Cabagan
Cabagan is famous for its eponymously named 'Pansit Cabagan', a local dish which was introduced by a Chinese trader Sia Lang in 1887 and has gained popularity in different parts of Luzon. There are several popular restaurants (locally called 'Panciterias') serving this dish along the main road/highway in Barangay Centro, Anao, Ugad and Cubag which include Felicitas Panciteria, Aling Kikay, Loling's Panciteria, Eddie's Restaurant, Josie's Panciteria, KJM, KCJM, Mariloi's Panciteria, Pin-tag Bistro Cafe and Zein's Panciteria.

Xentro Mall Cabagan, a newly opened shopping mall in Barangay Ugad

Tourism
 Malasi Tree Park and Wildlife Sanctuary, a bird sanctuary located in Barangay San Antonio, declared by the Department of Environment and Natural Resources as a critical habitat for Philippine ducks and migratory and endemic species of birds are spotted regularly 
 Cabagan Square Park in Barangay Centro, with its carousel which is the largest in the Philippines
Fort Cabagan (former military fort), Municipal Hall at Barangay Centro Cabagan, Isabela
Triangle Park, located at Barangay Ugad, where a towering led TV was installed
Aggabao Hall, old entertainment hall of Cabagan located at Barangay Centro
Josefina T. Albano Sports and Cultural Complex or the Cabagan Gymnasium, located at Barangay Centro, Cabagan, Isabela
 Biwag Shrine at Barangay Tallag
 Tulap Falls, a recently discovered waterfalls in Barangay Masipi East
Bonsur Creek, Bananao Rice Terraces at Barangay Masipi East
 St. Paul Parish Church in Barangay Centro
Religious Cross, Century Church bell, Century Well, Spanish Kiln near St. Paul the Apostle Parish Church
 Round Rock Resort in Barangay Cansan

Culture
Pansi Festival
Kalesa-Kabayu-Kalaseru (KKK) Festival
Sambali Festival

Government

Local government
The municipality is governed by a mayor designated as its local chief executive and by a municipal council as its legislative body in accordance with the Local Government Code. The mayor, vice mayor, and the councilors are elected directly by the people through an election which is being held every three years.

Elected officials

Congress representation
Cabagan, as a municipality, belongs to the first legislative district of the province of Isabela. The current representative is Hon. Antonio T. Albano.

Education
The Schools Division of Isabela governs the town's public education system. The division office is a field office of the DepEd in Cagayan Valley region. The office governs the public and private elementary and public and private high schools throughout the municipality.

Media
There is one FM radio station that operates in the municipality which is DWSA.

Notable personalities

 Alex Pagulayan, a Filipino-Canadian professional pool and snooker player, the 2004 world champion in billiards, hails from San Juan, a remote barangay of Cabagan.
 Rodolfo Albano III, Filipino politician, Representative of the First District of Isabela (1998-2001, 2004-2010, 2013-2019), Vice Governor of Isabela (2010-2013) and incumbent governor of Isabela province.

References

External links
Municipal Profile at the National Competitiveness Council of the Philippines
Cabagan at the Isabela Government Website
Local Governance Performance Management System
[ Philippine Standard Geographic Code]
Philippine Census Information
Municipality of Cabagan

Municipalities of Isabela (province)
Populated places on the Rio Grande de Cagayan
1877 establishments in the Spanish Empire